Pamela Joan Rogers (born July 1, 1977) is an American former elementary school physical education teacher and coach who taught in McMinnville, Tennessee.  She was convicted of four counts of sexual battery in 2005 and two counts of solicitation of sexual exploitation of a minor in 2006 stemming from a three-month relationship with a 13-year-old boy who was her student at Centertown Elementary School. Her case made headlines and was covered by major news networks for being a notorious teacher who had an unlawful sexual relationship with one of her students. After getting released in 2012, she was taken into custody in 2015 for allegedly conspiring to smuggle contraband cell phones into a state prison; her case brought headlines and national attention to the problem of cellphone smuggling into prison. Local news sources reported she was still in custody as of July 2017.

Personal life 
Born on July 1, 1977, Rogers attended Tennessee Technological University and Cumberland University, playing basketball for both. She married high school basketball coach Christopher Turner in 2003. They separated in 2004 due to marital difficulties and he filed for divorce in January 2005.

Criminal prosecution
On February 4, 2005, Rogers was charged with 15 counts of sexual battery by an authority figure and 13 counts of statutory rape stemming from a three-month relationship with a teenage boy who was her student.  On August 12, 2005, Rogers pleaded no contest to four charges of sexual battery by an authority figure as part of a deal with the prosecution.  She was given an eight year suspended sentence, during which she was to serve 270 days in the Warren County jail in Tennessee followed by seven years and three months of probation.  She was also ordered to surrender her teaching certificate and register as a sex offender for life because sexual battery by an authority figure is a "violent sexual offense" under the law of the state of Tennessee. The sentence prohibited her from profiting from the case through books and movies as well as barring her from granting interviews for eight years.

Rogers was arrested again on April 24, 2006, on charges that she had sent text messages, nude photos, and sex videos of herself to the same boy while using her father's cellphone. She was also charged for communicating with the boy via blogs and a website. The judge ordered Rogers to remain in jail until her next court hearing. On July 14, 2006, she was sentenced to seven years in prison for violating her probation by sending explicit videos to her former victim and maintaining contact with him via online blogs. Rogers asked for mercy and apologized to her family and the teen's family, saying tearfully to the judge, "I have humiliated myself. What I did was wrong, I am willing to do anything to rehabilitate myself." She asked for local incarceration with therapy. Circuit Judge Bart Stanley denied her request saying, "You have done everything except show this court that you wanted to rehabilitate yourself." He revoked Rogers' probation and ordered her to serve the rest of a seven-year prison sentence at the Tennessee Prison for Women.

Rogers received two additional years of prison time in January 2007, after she pleaded guilty to sending nude photos of herself to the boy.  She was released in 2012.

On May 28, 2015, Rogers was indicted by a grand jury for introduction of contraband into a state penal facility and arrested, having allegedly conspired with two others to smuggle cell phones into the state prison where she had previously been incarcerated. In 2016, Rogers was featured in the Headline News segment Twisted: Teachers Who Prey. Local news sources reported she was still in custody as of July 2017.

See also
 Cougar (slang)
 Hebephilia
 Sexual harassment in education
 Statutory rape#Female-male statutory rape
 Jennifer Fichter
 Debra Lafave
 Mary Kay Letourneau

Notes

References
Felony Offender Information TOMIS ID: 00396311
Jail For Teacher In Sex Case Aug. 12, 2005

1977 births
Living people
American people convicted of child sexual abuse
Schoolteachers from Tennessee
American women educators
People from McMinnville, Tennessee
Prisoners and detainees of Tennessee
School sexual abuse scandals
21st-century American criminals
American female criminals
Tennessee Technological University alumni
Cumberland University alumni
21st-century American women